Black and White is the second studio album and major label debut by British hip hop recording artist Wretch 32. The album was released in the United Kingdom on 21 August 2011 through Ministry of Sound, debuting at number four on the UK Albums Chart with first week sales of nearly 25,000 copies. The album follows his independent debut album, Wretchrospective, which was released three years earlier, in 2008. The album spawned six singles over the course of eighteen months, all of which peaked inside the UK top 50, including three top five singles, and a number one single, "Don't Go". The album includes collaborations with Ed Sheeran, Daley, Etta Bond and Example.

Singles
 "Traktor" was released as the first single released from the album on 16 January 2011. It peaked at number five on the UK Singles Chart, becoming the third most successful single from the album. The track features vocals from L Marshall and was produced by Yogi.
 "Unorthodox" was released as the second single from the album on 17 April 2011. It peaked at number two on the UK Singles Chart, becoming the second most successful single from the album. The track features vocals from Example.
 "Don't Go" was released as the third single from the album on 14 August 2011. It peaked at number one on the UK Singles Chart, becoming the album's most successful single. The track features vocals from upcoming musician and songwriter Josh Kumra.
 "Forgiveness" was released as the fourth single from the album on 11 December 2011. It peaked at number 39 on the UK Singles Chart, becoming the least successful single from the album. The track features vocals from Etta Bond, and was produced by Labrinth.
 "Long Way Home" was released as a single from the album on 14 February 2012, in promotion of the track's featuring artist, Daley. It was ineligible to chart on the UK Singles Chart, and was simply released in the form of a promotional music video.
 "Hush Little Baby" was released as the fifth and final single from the album on 27 May 2012. It peaked at number 35 on the UK Singles Chart, due to little promotion. The track features vocals from singer-songwriter Ed Sheeran.

Track listing 

Notes
 "Forgiveness" features uncredited vocals from Labrinth.

Sample credits
 "Black and White" samples "Different Strokes" by Syl Johnson
 "Unorthodox" samples "Fools Gold" by The Stone Roses.
 "Hush Little Baby" adapts lyrics from the lullaby "Hush, Little Baby".

Charts

Certifications

Release history

References

2011 albums
Wretch 32 albums
Ministry of Sound albums
Albums produced by Labrinth
Albums produced by TMS (production team)